George David "Red" Munger (October 4, 1918 – July 23, 1996) was an American professional baseball player, a right-handed pitcher who spent a decade in Major League Baseball for the St. Louis Cardinals (1943–44; 1946–52) and Pittsburgh Pirates (1952; 1956).

Munger pitched a complete game, 12–3 victory over the Boston Red Sox in Game 4 of the 1946 World Series at Fenway Park. He gave up nine hits, including a home run by future Hall of Famer Bobby Doerr, but only one run was earned.  Munger's victory in his only World Series appearance was the only Cardinal win not registered by teammate Harry Brecheen, whose three triumphs propelled the Redbirds to a seven-game World Series championship over the Red Sox.

A three-time National League All-Star, Munger worked in 273 regular-season Major League games during his career, winning 77 and losing 56 (.583) with an earned run average of 3.83.  He struck out 564 batters in 1,228 innings pitched. In 1944, he won 11 of 14 decisions in 21 games, 12 as a starter, with a 1.34 earned run average. He entered the United States Army for World War II service during the middle of that campaign, and did not qualify for the National League's ERA title. He also missed the 1944 World Series, which delivered another Cardinal championship.

Munger took a regular turn in the Cardinal starting rotation from mid-1946 through 1950, then was traded to the Pirates in May 1952. Pittsburgh sent Munger to their top minor league affiliate, the Hollywood Stars of the Pacific Coast League, and he responded with 17- and 23-win seasons in 1954–55. During the latter year, at age 36, he registered 25 complete games and an ERA of 1.85. The standout season brought Munger to the Major Leagues for one last campaign, as a relief pitcher and occasional starter for the 1956 Pirates. All told, as a minor leaguer, Munger won 152 games; as a professional, he compiled a 229–174 (.568) record during a career that stretched from 1937 to 1958.

Munger died in 1996, in Houston, aged 77.

See also
 List of St. Louis Cardinals team records

References

External links

1918 births
1996 deaths
United States Army personnel of World War II
Asheville Tourists players
Baseball players from Houston
Columbus Red Birds players
Hollywood Stars players
Houston Buffaloes players
Major League Baseball pitchers
National League All-Stars
New Iberia Cardinals players
Pittsburgh Pirates players
Sacramento Solons players
St. Louis Cardinals players
San Antonio Missions players
Seattle Rainiers players